Seaton High School is a coeducational public secondary school based in Seaton, a suburb of the City of Charles Sturt in western Adelaide, South Australia. The school has a total enrolment of more than 800 students per year, with an official count of 883 students in 2019.

Seaton High School's current role of Principal is held by Richard Abell. The school also consists of one Deputy Principal, two Assistant Principals, one Business Manager, three Wellbeing Officers, seven Year Level Coordinators and 63 full-time equivalent teaching staff.

During the early 2020s, the school underwent major redevelopments through utilisation of a $20 million grant through the Department for Education's Better Schools Program. The development process was finalised prior to the introduction of the Year 7 cohort to the school in 2022.

Facilities
Facilities at Seaton High School include:
 Trade Training Centre
 Drama and Dance Studio
 Multimedia suite
 Two specialist art rooms
 Japanese Language Centre
 Baseball Training Centre
 Gymnasium
 Tennis, basketball and netball courts

Curriculum

Specialist programs
Special interest programs available to students at Seaton High School include:
 Diamond Sports Program
 Emerging Technologies Specialist Program
 Students with High Intellectual Potential (SHIP) Program
 UAV Specialist Program
 Visual Arts and Innovation Specialist Program

Vocational Education & Training
Seaton High School offers the following three Vocational Education & Training (VET) courses:
 Electrotechnology: Certificate I & II in Electrical
 Plumbing: Certificate in Construction - Plumbing
 Plumbing Plus: Certificate III Roof Plumbing (Partial)

References

External links
 

Public schools in South Australia
Secondary schools in Adelaide
Special interest high schools in South Australia
Educational institutions established in 1964
1964 establishments in Australia